Caesar's Hour is a live, hour-long American sketch-comedy television program that aired on NBC from 1954 until 1957. The program starred, among others, Sid Caesar, Nanette Fabray, Carl Reiner, Howard Morris, Janet Blair, and Milt Kamen, and featured a number of cameo roles by famous entertainers such as Joan Crawford and Peggy Lee.

Widely considered a continuation of Caesar's earlier programs, the Admiral Broadway Revue and Your Show of Shows, Caesar's Hour included most of the same writers and actors, with the notable addition of Larry Gelbart (who went on to co-create the M*A*S*H TV series with Gene Reynolds) in the latter show. Nanette Fabray replaced Imogene Coca, who opted to star in her own TV series in 1954, The Imogene Coca Show. 

Caesar's Hour expanded on the format of Your Show of Shows with many sketches running a half-hour or more, including musical parodies such as "There's No Business" and "Towers Trot", and genre parodies such as "Bullets over Broadway" (a gangster film takeoff) and "Aggravation Boulevard" (with Caesar as a Rudolph Valentino/John Gilbert character who fails to make the transition from silents to talkies).  Many of the sketches are centered on a domineering star who flames out, prefiguring Caesar's postseries personal and career troubles.

From July to September 1956, NBC ran The Ernie Kovacs Show as a summer replacement series for Caesar's Hour.

The writing staff of the show was reunited in 1996 for an event at the Writers Guild Theater in Los Angeles called Caesar's Hour Revisited, excerpts of which were broadcast on PBS under the title Caesar's Writers. The full two-hour event was available on VHS as a pledge premium from PBS. It was released on DVD for the first time on December 12, 2011.  The reunion featured Caesar with Mel Tolkin (head writer), Neil Simon, Danny Simon, Mel Brooks, Carl Reiner, Woody Allen, Larry Gelbart, Sheldon Keller, Aaron Ruben, and Gary Belkin.  The moderator and researcher was Bob Claster.

Episode status
As with Your Show of Shows, most of the original kinescopes of Caesar's Hour do survive.  Complete episodes and segments (of episodes that only exist in partial form) from the series survive at the UCLA Film and Television Archive in Los Angeles and The Paley Center for Media in Manhattan and Beverly Hills, California.

References

External links

 Caesar's Writers

1954 American television series debuts
1957 American television series endings
1950s American sketch comedy television series
1950s American comedy television series
American live television series
Black-and-white American television shows
English-language television shows
NBC original programming
Primetime Emmy Award for Outstanding Variety Series winners
Television shows filmed in New York (state)